BD, Bd or bd may refer to:

In arts and entertainment 
 B. D. (Doonesbury), a major character in the Doonesbury comic strip
 Bande dessinée (or "bédé"), a French term for comics
 Bass drum, in sheet music notation
 Brahe Djäknar, a Finnish choir
 Broder Daniel, a Swedish indie pop band
 Ben Drowned, a web serial and web series, focused on the character of the same name
 ВD, shorthand name for the Russian gaming magazine, Velikij Drakon, where the "В" character is actually the Russian letter "ve".
 Bette Davis's production company

In business

Business / Technology
 B&D Australia, manufacturing company
 Big data, a marketing term for technology of large data sets
 Broker-dealer
 Business day, a day of the week on which business is conducted
 Business development, techniques aimed at attracting customers and penetrating markets
 Business directory, a website or printed listing of information which lists all businesses within some category

Businesses
 Bad Dragon, an American manufacturer of fantasy-themed sex toys
 Becton Dickinson (BD.com), an American manufacturer of medical supplies
 BMI (airline), or British Midland Airways (IATA airline code BD until 2012)
 Building Design, a British architectural magazine
 Cambodia Bayon Airlines (IATA airline code BD from 2014)

Places
 Bangladesh, (ISO 3166-1 country code BD)
 .bd, the country top-level domain for Bangladesh
 BD postcode area, UK, for Bradford, West Yorkshire, and the surrounding area
 Bermuda, where "BD" is the FIPS PUB 10-4 territory code and obsolete NATO country code
 Brunei Darussalam, where "BD" is the World Meteorological Organization country code

In science and technology

In computing
 Baud (Bd), an information unit
 %BD, the URL encoded version of the one half (½) symbol
 Big data, data sets that are so large or complex that traditional data processing applications are inadequate
 Blu-ray Disc, a high density blue laser optical disc format, or the successor of DVD
 BD+, a component of the Blu-ray Disc Digital Rights Management system

In biology and medicine
 Batrachochytrium dendrobatidis, a fungus that causes the fatal amphibian disease chytridiomycosis
 BD butterfly, Callicore cynosura
 Bipolar disorder, a mood disorder
 "Bis die" (Latin for "twice a day"; also Bid (Medical): "bis in diem") an indication that a medication needs to be taken twice a day

Other uses in science and technology
 Bonner Durchmusterung, a 19th-century star catalog

Other uses
 Bachelor of Divinity, an academic degree
 Bandung railway station, West Java, Indonesia (station code: BD)
 Battle Dress, a British military uniform
 Bloor-Danforth, a subway line in Toronto, Canada
 Bondage (BDSM) and Discipline (BDSM), in sexual role-play
Black Disciples, a black street gang based in Chicago, United States